Compass is a British centre-left pressure group, aligned with the Labour Party which describes itself as: "'An umbrella grouping of the progressive left whose sum is greater than its parts". Like the formally Labour-affiliated think tank the Fabian Society it is a membership-based organisation and thus seeks to be a pressure group and a force for political organisation and mobilisation.

Compass was launched in 2003 with the publication of a founding statement called A Vision for the Democratic Left. Supported by a number of academics and Labour politicians unhappy with the political direction of prime minister Tony Blair this was the first attempt by Compass to help guide the Labour government. Since then it has published pamphlets and a series of booklets as part of its Programme for Renewal charting an alternative path for left governments and for centre-left activists in the UK.

Activities

Since its inception, Compass has risen in influence and media prominence. The Chair, Neal Lawson, has written for The Guardian newspaper and when he called for Tony Blair to resign in May 2006, it was widely reported elsewhere.

Compass organises an annual conference. The event on 17 June 2006, included many figures identified with Labour and the trade union movement such as Ed Balls, Neal Lawson, Derek Simpson, Hilary Benn, Fiona Millar, John Harris, Hazel Blears, Kevin Maguire, and Ed Miliband. There were calls for, amongst other things, the abolition of the monarchy and the destruction of nuclear weapons put forward by the membership. In 2006 it merged with the Catalyst think tank.

The 2007 Robin Cook Memorial Conference "Shaping Our Global World", included speakers such as Ken Livingstone, Dave Prentis, Frances O'Grady, Jon Cruddas and Helena Kennedy as well as panels and seminars organised by groups such as Unison, Friends of the Earth, War on Want, Liberty, the Fabian Society and the Citizen Organising Foundation.

In 2010, Compass established the High Pay Commission on top pay and inequality, which in turn became the High Pay Centre think tank in 2011.

The Compass website is a source of information about Labour politics with regularly posted opinion pieces written by a wide range of authors with an invitation for responses from readers.

Since a decision in 2011 to open membership to people from other political parties, Compass has lost influence within the Labour Party.

Programme for Renewal
The Programme for Renewal is the name of the Compass policy review. This has involved commissioned 'thinkpieces' for publication on the organisation's website, seminars, working groups and online discussions involving over a hundred academics, policy thinkers and practitioners. The outcome of this process was three short books. The Good Society outlined the Compass conception of a progressive society,  A New Political Economy explored progressive and alternative economic policies and Democracy and the Public Realm looked at the renewal of democratic processes and structures. The text of these books was made available online in order to be subjected to discussion and debate.

Governing structure
Compass is managed by a committee of persons elected by the membership bi-annually. The Management Committee 'provide[s] strategic direction for Compass and make[s] decisions on behalf of the membership'. In an attempt to promote equality, the Committee has a gender quota. The Committee meets between four and five times a year.

Previous members have included MPs Jon Trickett and Chuka Umunna.

Compass holds an Annual General Meeting open to all members at which the constitution, policy and strategy of the organisation can be debated and amended.

Compass Youth
Compass Youth is an autonomous organisation which aims to engage young people to find out what issues really matter, develop their skills to turn ideas into action as well as organise and champion campaigns young people can get involved in.

It is best known for its campaigning on Votes at 16, its participative manifesto debates and Love Difference festivals. It has developed right across the country represented regionally and on university campuses.

It also has its own YouTube, Facebook, Flickr, and Netvibes channels.

Sam Tarry MP, was previously chair of the Compass Youth Organising Committee.

Funding 
In November 2022, the funding transparency website Who Funds You? gave Compass an A grade, the highest transparency rating (rating goes from A to E).

See also
Breakfast Club (British politics)
Clause Four Group
Labour Co-ordinating Committee
Labour Representation Committee (2004)
The Manifesto Group

References

External links 

Ceasefire Interview

2003 establishments in the United Kingdom
Labour Party (UK) factions
Organisations associated with the Labour Party (UK)
Political advocacy groups in the United Kingdom
Political and economic think tanks based in the United Kingdom
Progressivism in the United Kingdom
Think tanks based in the United Kingdom
Think tanks established in 2003
Socialist think tanks based in the United Kingdom